United Nations Security Council resolution 760, adopted unanimously on 18 June 1992, after reaffirming resolutions 752 (1992), 757 (1992) and 758 (1992) which brought attention to the need for humanitarian aid in the former Yugoslavia, the council, acting under Chapter VII of the United Nations Charter, exempted humanitarian goods such as food and medical aid from the prohibitions under Resolution 757.

See also
 Breakup of Yugoslavia
 Bosnian War
 Croatian War of Independence
 List of United Nations Security Council Resolutions 701 to 800 (1991–1993)
 Ten-Day War
 Yugoslav Wars

References

External links
 
Text of the Resolution at undocs.org

 0760
 0760
1992 in Yugoslavia
 0760
United Nations Security Council sanctions regimes
June 1992 events
Sanctions against Yugoslavia